Patricia Lee (born 1974/1975) is an American lawyer from Nevada who serves as a justice of the Nevada Supreme Court.

Early life and education 

Lee was born in South Korea to an African American military father and a native Korean mother. She graduated from Lompoc High School in 1993. She earned a Bachelor of Arts in psychology and communications from the University of Southern California in 1997 and a Juris Doctor from the George Washington University Law School in 2002.

Career 

From 2002 to 2022, Lee worked at the law firm Hutchison and Steffen, becoming partner in 2009.

Nevada Supreme Court 

In October 2022, Lee was one of six applicants to apply for the vacancy on the Nevada Supreme Court. On November 21, 2022, Governor Steve Sisolak appointed Lee as a justice of the Nevada Supreme Court to fill the seat left by the resignation of Justice Abbi Silver. She is the first African American woman and the first Asian American to serve on the Nevada Supreme Court.

Personal life 

Lee married her husband Ronnie in 2006 and they have two children.

References 

1970s births
Living people
21st-century American lawyers
21st-century American women judges
21st-century American judges
21st-century American women lawyers
Year of birth missing (living people)
African-American judges
African-American lawyers
American jurists of Korean descent
George Washington University Law School alumni
Nevada lawyers
South Korean emigrants to the United States
University of Southern California alumni